Micropterix facetella is a species of moth belonging to the family Micropterigidae, which was described by Zeller in 1851. Micropterix facetella has a 4 male facetalla to 1 female facetalla ratio and during the mating season female facetella are said to visit a flower, only to eat, and the male facetella are there for the purpose to mate. For the common ratio, the male facetella goes to a near by location that another male facetella was already there as a pursuit of competition. A competition on who will get the female first, which is why there is 4 males facetalla for every 1 female facetella. It is known from Croatia and Slovenia.

References

External links
Image

Micropterigidae
Moths described in 1851
Moths of Europe
Taxa named by Philipp Christoph Zeller